Rebecca Rivera (born May 12, 1995) is a Filipino-Canadian volleyball athlete for Petron Blaze Spiker and plays as a setter.

Career
She is the primary setter for the UConn Huskies. She appeared for 29 games in her first season for the Huskies. Rivera played with Sta. Lucia Lady Realtors for the 2017 PSL All-Filipino Conference season.

Personal life
Rebecca grew up in Mississauga, Ontario with her parents Leo and Myra Rivera. She has a brother Brandon-Sage and a sister Amanda Leigh. She is a close relative of Filipino actor Ariel Rivera.

Clubs
  Sta. Lucia Lady Realtors (2017—2019)
  Petron Blaze Spikers (2020—present)

References

Filipino women's volleyball players
Living people
UConn Huskies women's volleyball players
Expatriate volleyball players in the United States
1995 births
Canadian sportspeople of Filipino descent
Sportspeople from Mississauga
Setters (volleyball)